Chrystal Soo Jung (born October 24, 1994), professionally known as Krystal, Krystal Jung or Jung Soo-jung, is a  Korean-American singer and actress based in South Korea. She debuted in 2009 as a member of the South Korean girl group f(x) and has further participated in SM Entertainment's project group SM the Ballad. Aside from group activities, she has also acted in various South Korean drama series such as The Heirs (2013), My Lovely Girl (2014), Prison Playbook (2017), The Bride of Habaek (2017), Player (2018), Search (2020), Police University (2021) and Crazy Love (2022).

Early life
Jung was born as Chrystal Soo Jung in San Francisco, California, where her family settled from South Korea in the 1980s.

During a family trip to South Korea in early 2000, at the age of five, Jung and her sister Jessica Jung were spotted by  SM Entertainment, which earned her a cameo appearance in Shinhwa's "Wedding March" music video. SM offered Jung and her sister singing and dancing lessons in order to professionally train them for a music career. However, the offer was turned down by her parents, who reasoned that she was too young, so they only allowed her sister to join the company at first. Her sister later debuted as a member of the girl group Girls' Generation. They have since appeared together in many events.

In 2002, Jung began appearing in television commercials. She first appeared in a Lotte commercial with South Korean actress Han Ga-in. In 2006, her parents finally allowed her to join SM, and the agency then enrolled her in dance-classes. She was trained for 3 years before debuting as a part of f(x) in 2009.

After moving to South Korea, Jung attended Korea Kent Foreign School, then graduated from Hanlim Multi Art School on February 7, 2013, where she was honored with an achievement award. She is currently attending Sungkyunkwan University, majoring in theater.

Career

2009–2013: Career beginnings

Jung debuted as vocalist of the South Korean girl group f(x) in September 2009.

In March 2010, Jung participated in a series of music videos under the Melody Project, playing a young student who is in love with her music teacher. She released a solo single titled "Melody" for this project. Jung then became a host for the music show The M-Wave with Thunder from MBLAQ. In July, the singer debuted as an actress with a minor role in the long-running sitcom More Charming by the Day. She received the "Newcomer Comedy Award" at the 2010 MBC Entertainment Awards for the role.

In 2011, Jung participated in and won first place in SBS's figure-skating show Kim Yuna's Kiss & Cry. She also starred in the sitcom High Kick 3, playing the role of a superficial and shallow girl who does not have much depth of feelings.

In 2013, Jung starred in the SBS teen drama The Heirs, playing the role of a spoiled yet kind-hearted wealthy high school student. Her character in the show generated positive recognition among viewers, and she was voted as the Best Onscreen Couple along with CNBLUE's Kang Min-hyuk at the 2013 DramaFever Awards.

In 2013, Jung and group mate Sulli became the new faces of the makeup brand Etude House.

2014–present: SM The Ballad, acting career and label changes

In 2014, Jung joined the ballad group SM the Ballad, initially formed by SM Entertainment in 2010. On the group's 2nd album Breath, she sang the Japanese version of the title track "Breath" with TVXQ's Changmin. She also sang a duet with Exo's Chen titled "When I Was... When U Were...". Jung performed her duet with Chen live at the S.M. The Ballad Joint Recital on February 12. In June, Jung, along with her sister Jessica, was featured in the reality show, Jessica & Krystal. The show took on a more close and personal side of the two sisters, addressing their public image and sisterly bond.

Later in the year, Jung got her first leading role in the SBS's drama My Lovely Girl, alongside Rain. She portrayed a girl who moves from the countryside to Seoul to pursue a music career and ends up meeting a fateful love during the process. Commenting on Jung's work attitude, Director Park Hyung-ki stated "Despite taking on a difficult character, she shows her determination to pull it off through her gaze to the point you can see sincerity in Krystal when she's in front of the camera." She released a solo single "All of a Sudden" for the drama's OST. At the Baeksang Arts Awards, Jung won the "Most Popular Actress" award in the television category for her role in the drama.

In 2015, Jung starred alongside actor Seo Jun-young in a 10-minute film entitled, Listen To My Song for W Korea's 10th anniversary. Jung was also cast in leading roles in an upcoming Chinese movie, titled Unexpected Love along with EXO's Lay; and in the Chinese drama Graduation Season alongside Deng Lun.

On February 12, 2017, it was reported that Jung would release the collaboration single "I Don't Wanna Love You" with Glen Check's member June One Kim. The song was revealed for the first time on February 14 at the re-opening of a clothing store in Seoul, and then be released online at midnight KST on February 15. In July, Jung starred in tvN's drama spin-off of the Korean manga Bride of the Water God. The same year she starred in the black comedy drama Prison Playbook, produced by Reply PD Shin Won-ho; she received good reviews for her performance. Jung was named 'Woman of the Year' by GQ Korea.

In 2018, Jung was cast as the female lead in OCN's crime action drama Player. At the press conference for the drama, Jung stated that she learned how to ride a motorcycle in order to do her own stunts.

In 2019, Jung and her sister Jessica filmed their second reality show in the United States. The same year, she was cast in the independent romance film More Than Family, and romantic comedy film Sweet & Sour.

In 2020, Jung was cast in OCN's military cinematic drama Search, where she played an elite army officer. The drama premiered on October 17, 2020.

After reports began swirling of Jung departing SM Entertainment, SM responded that their contract with her would expire by the end of August 2020, and they were in discussions with her for a possible renewal. Krystal's departure from SM was officially announced in October 2020 and signed with H& Entertainment as her new agency.

In 2021, Jung starred in KBS2's drama Police University, playing Oh Kang-hee, a freshman at National Police University, alongside Cha Tae-hyun and  Jinyoung.

In 2022, Jung starred in KBS2's romantic-comedy-drama Crazy Love alongside Kim Jae-wook.

Discography

Singles

Soundtrack appearances

Filmography

Film

Television series

Web series

Television shows

Awards and nominations

References

External links

 Official website 
 
 

1994 births
21st-century American women singers
Actresses from San Francisco
American actresses of Korean descent
American child singers
American expatriates in South Korea
American women pop singers
American film actresses
American musicians of Korean descent
American television actresses
F(x) (group) members
Hanlim Multi Art School alumni
Japanese-language singers of South Korea
Korean-language singers of the United States
American K-pop singers
Living people
Musicians from San Francisco
SM Entertainment artists
Sungkyunkwan University alumni
South Korean female idols
21st-century American singers